Stoney Creek Bridge is a Canadian Pacific Railway (CP)  truss arch in southeastern British Columbia. This single-track crossing over Stoney Creek is in Glacier National Park, between Revelstoke and Golden.

1885 wooden bridge
Stoney Creek was the highest timber bridge ever built, and at the time was the second highest bridge in North America with reference to deck height, rather than structural height. Deck height is the maximum vertical drop from the bridge deck to the ground or water surface below. However, various sources yield a range of height measurements for this wooden structure. 

Recalculating the measurement using the planning and photographic evidence indicates an  deck height.

The confined workspace of the narrow gulch and the unstable rock foundation slowed construction. A flash flood, which buried the foundations of the high tower, cost two days of work. After a forest fire consumed 14 cars of lumber for the bridge, loggers had to fell additional trees to replace the loss. Completed in early August 1885, construction took seven weeks, which included ten days lost owing to the death of two workers and wet weather. Although each of the very high bridges on the east slope of the Selkirk Mountains had been construction challenges, this final one proved the most problematic.

No other railway has ever matched CP in building as many high timber bridges as were required to initially conquer the mountainous terrain of eastern British Columbia.

1894 steel bridge

Construction
In 1893, 3,000 carloads of rock were railed from a Salmon Arm quarry. During construction, a carpenter struck by dislodged rock sustained fatal injuries on falling to the bottom of the ravine. A Hamilton Bridge Co. employee fell to his death later that year. This company replaced the existing crossing with an 
After load testing, work was suspended until the spring 1894 completion and opening. The design could comfortably support the combined weight of two mountain region locomotives.

Strengthening
To handle heavier locomotives, CP proposed to replace the structure with a new  cantilever deck truss with  flanking anchor spans, built adjacent to the existing bridge. However, the unsuitable rock foundation of the canyon made the idea uneconomical.

In 1929, the Canadian Bridge Co. undertook the installation, and replaced the deck lattice girder spans with deck plate girders. The design could support four locomotives with a combined weight of 1,100 tons. In 1970, the load capacity was re-evaluated for the introduction of bulk commodity unit trains. In 1999, another strength evaluation was conducted. The western approach comprises a sharp bend in the track to cross the gorge at its narrowest point.

Since the opening of the lower Macdonald Track in 1988 for westbound traffic, the Stoney Creek arch on the Connaught Track has primarily handled the lighter eastbound trains. Although fatigue damage during the prior 15 years was considerable, the bridge maintains an expected long life. However, to safely sustain present and future train loads, some deficient parts may require strengthening.

Accident
In 2015, six cars of a westbound freight derailed on the bridge. The train had diverted to the eastbound route because the Mount Macdonald Tunnel was being vented. The incident occurred when the train lost momentum on the steeper grade and stopped with the cars on the bridge. However, restarting on the curve caused the heavier cars at the front and rear of the train to lift the lighter middle cars from the track.

Notability
When opened, the 1894 bridge ranked seventh in height: Garabit Viaduct (1885)  Loa Viaduct (1888)  Pecos River High Bridge (1892)  Malleco Viaduct (1890) Kinzua Viaduct (1882) Young's High Bridge (1889) Stoney Creek Bridge (1894) 

Although no longer world rating, the crossing ranks second to Lethbridge Viaduct (1909)  in Western Canada.

The bridge and its locale have been the subject of numerous CP promotional photographs that have gained iconic status. Among the most recognized are those by CP special photographer Nicholas Morant featuring The Canadian when it was the railway's flagship streamliner. In the mid-1980s, several television commercials to promote the railway were filmed at the bridge site.

Siding
Stoney Creek is a  siding at Mile 77.7, Mountain Subdivision. Adjacent to the west is Glacier (Mile 85.5), and east is Griffith (Mile 71.7). The bridge (Mile 76.2) is immediately northwest in an overall eastward direction.

1988 bridge
Completed in fall 1986, the spans for the John Fox viaduct were unloaded at the south end of this bridge from early July 1987. On December 12, 1988, the first revenue train, hauling coal, passed over the bridge, and reduced an hour of the journey.

References

References

Bridges completed in 1885
Bridges completed in 1894
Canadian Pacific Railway bridges in Canada
Open-spandrel deck arch bridges in Canada
Railway bridges in British Columbia
Steel bridges in Canada
Truss arch bridges in Canada
Truss bridges in Canada